Anatoliko is a village and a community of the Eordaia municipality. Before the 2011 local government reform it was part of the municipality of Vermio, of which it was a municipal district. The 2011 census recorded 903 inhabitants in the village.

References

Populated places in Kozani (regional unit)